Isturgia contexta is a moth of the  family Geometridae. It is found in Madagascar and Comoros.

The length of the forewings is 12 to 16mm,The wings are whitish/ochreous-grey  ground colour with darker clusting.
Underside is cream-white. The antennae of the male are bipectinated, female antennae are ciliated.

Biology
Specimen of this species have been collected from sea level up to 1200m, during the whole year except September.

References

Macariini
Moths described in 1891
Moths of Madagascar
Moths of the Comoros